Gerald Hugh Brabazon (7 December 1854 – 27 December 1938) was a Canadian politician.

Born in Montreal, Quebec, the son of Samuel L. Brabazon and Margaret Clarke both from Ireland, Brabazon was a civil engineer. He mayor of Portage-du-Fort, Quebec for 18 years and Warden of Pontiac County for 12 years. He served under Frederick Dobson Middleton in the North-West Rebellion in 1885, as a first lieutenant in Dennis's Scouts. He was an unsuccessful candidate for the House of Commons of Canada in Pontiac in the general elections of 1900 but was elected in 1904. A Conservative, he was defeated in 1908 and was elected in 1911.

References
 
 The Canadian Parliament; biographical sketches and photo-engravures of the senators and members of the House of Commons of Canada. Being the tenth Parliament, elected 3 November 1904

1854 births
1938 deaths
Conservative Party of Canada (1867–1942) MPs
Mayors of places in Quebec
Members of the House of Commons of Canada from Quebec